Pukaskwa Pits are rock-lined depressions near the northern shore of Lake Superior dug by early inhabitants, ancestors of the Ojibwa, named after the Pukaskwa River in Ontario, Canada. Estimates of their age range from as recent as 1100-1600 CE, to as ancient as 3000-8000 BCE.

Description and purpose
These rock-lined pits are dug in cobblestone beaches and are about one to two metres long and one and a half metre deep. The pits came to academic light in 1949, and were studied by the Royal Ontario Museum, University of Toronto and Lakehead University. Theories about the purpose of these pits range from hunting blinds to food storage pits to spiritual sites. The larger pits or "lodges" may have been seasonal dwellings with domed coverings. The smaller pits may have been used to cook food or smoke fish, but this seems unlikely, since there is never any sign of a hearth or fire-cracked rock close at hand.

Although no archaeological evidence suggests the pits were used ceremonially, their location near spectacular, panoramic views of the lake have suggested a popular theory calling them "thunderbird nests" used for "vision quests".

A new theory suggests that Pukaskwa Pits were used as ice houses: in the spring, beach ice may have been piled into them along with fish or game to be frozen well into the summer.

Pukaskwa National Park

Pukaskwa National Park was established in 1978 to protect a large clustering of these Pukaskwa pits.

Footnotes

References 

 
 
 
 
 

Ojibwe in Canada
Anishinaabe culture
Geography of Algoma District
Geography of Thunder Bay District
Lake Superior
 
History of indigenous peoples of North America
Hunter-gatherers of Canada